New Village Girls Academy is an all-girls, college preparatory charter school, which opened in September 2006 with grades 9 and 10. For the school year beginning in September 2007, 11th grade was added; 12th grade was added the following year.  The school is located near Rampart and Beverly Boulevards in Los Angeles, California.

Charter school
New Village Girls Academy is the first all-girl charter school in California.

The school provides individual counseling services and small group problem solving groups to assist young women in addressing personal and human development challenges. Through reflection in advisory, weekly group discussion, journal writing and expression in drama, art, music and dance, girls have the opportunity to foster a positive emotional well-being.  New Village offers students the opportunity to participate in community service in nearby agencies. Young women can learn social responsibility by sharing, giving and volunteering in local health, senior citizen, and early education agencies. Through the David Lynch Foundation students have learned Transcendental Meditation, which has helped students in their daily lives.

References

External links
 
 Quiet Time at New Village
 PBS SoCal Bonnie Boswell Reports, New Village Girls Academy

Charter high schools in California
Girls' schools in California
High schools in Los Angeles
2006 establishments in California
Educational institutions established in 2006